The ABC Islands is the colloquial name for the Alaskan islands of Admiralty, Baranof, and Chichagof in the northern part of the Alexander Archipelago, which are all part of the Tongass National Forest. The islands are known for their wilderness and wildlife, including a dense brown bear population.

Most of the islands' area is federally protected wilderness. The city of Sitka has its urban center on the west coast of Baranof Island. Outside of Sitka, there is only minimal industry and human presence on the islands, despite the fact that Admiralty (7th), Baranof (10th), and Chichagof (5th) are among the largest islands in the United States.

References 

Islands of the Alexander Archipelago
Islands of Alaska